House of Miller at Millbach, also known as Mueller House and Illig's Mill, is a historic home and grist mill located in Millcreek Township, Lebanon County, Pennsylvania. It was built in 1752, and is a -story, sandstone and limestone residence with a gambrel roof in a Germanic style.  The mill was built in 1784, and is a -story, limestone building with a gable roof.  It is attached to the house.  Also on the property is a small log cabin.

It was added to the National Register of Historic Places in 1973.

References

External links

Houses on the National Register of Historic Places in Pennsylvania
Historic American Buildings Survey in Pennsylvania
Houses completed in 1752
Houses in Lebanon County, Pennsylvania
National Register of Historic Places in Lebanon County, Pennsylvania